Peiris, Peries or Pieris is a Sinhalese surname. It is a common surname in coastal area of Sri Lanka. It is originated from Portuguese surname Peres and was spread across Sri Lanka during Portuguese rule of the island. The name has been adapted into the Sinhalese language over time, hence the variation in its spelling. Notable people with the surname include:

 Albert Peries (born 1905), Ceylonese politician
 Amal Peiris (born 1985), Sri Lankan cricketer
 Bernard Peiris (1908–1977), Ceylonese lawyer
 Chathurika Peiris, Sri Lankan actress
 Eardley Peiris, Ceylonese broadcaster
 Edmund Peiris, Ceylonese headman
 Edmund Peiris, Sri Lankan Sinhala clergyman, 2nd Bishop of Halawata
 Ernest Victor Pieris, Sri Lankan Sinhala physician, medical educator, cricketer and rugby player
 G. L. Peiris (born 1946), Sri Lankan academic and politician
 Harold Peiris (1905–1981), Ceylonese lawyer
 Hiranya Peiris, British astrophysicist
 Ivan Peries (1921–1988), Sri Lankan painter
 J. B. Peiris, Sri Lankan physician
 James Peiris (1856–1930), Ceylonese politician
 Justin Pieris Deraniyagala (1903-1967), Sri Lankan Sinhala painter
 Lester James Peries (1919–2018), Sri Lankan film director
 M. V. P. Peiris, Ceylonese surgeon and politician
 Malik Peiris (born 1949), Hong Kong physician and academic
 Mevan Pieris (born 1946), Sri Lankan cricketer
 Milinda Peiris, Sri Lankan army officer
 Mohan Peiris, Sri Lankan lawyer and judge
 Ruwin Peiris (born 1970), Sri Lankan cricketer
 Stanley Peiris (1941–2002), Sri Lankan musician
 Sumitra Peries (born 1935), Sri Lankan film director
 Sachintha Peiris (born 16 November 1995), Sri Lankan cricketer
 Walikalage Sarath Peiris Jayawardene (born 1969), Sri Lankan Sinhala cricketer

See also
 Peres
 Pieris (disambiguation)
 Pérez, a surname with at least two distinct origins
 
 
 

Sinhalese surnames